The Waimea Plains is a small but fertile area of low-lying land southwest of the port city of Nelson, situated on Tasman Bay / Te Tai-o-Aorere in the South Island of New Zealand. It is irrigated by the Waimea River from the Waimea Inlet in the north and bounded by the town of Brightwater in the south. The fertile soil promotes the growth of kiwifruit, apples and vineyards.

The temperate climate allows for the growth of crops such as hops and grapes.

Demographics
Demographics of the Waimea Plains east of the river are covered at Appleby

Waimea West had a population of 1,137 at the 2018 New Zealand census, an increase of 48 people (4.4%) since the 2013 census, and an increase of 99 people (9.5%) since the 2006 census. There were 402 households. There were 579 males and 558 females, giving a sex ratio of 1.04 males per female. The median age was 47.4 years (compared with 37.4 years nationally), with 195 people (17.2%) aged under 15 years, 189 (16.6%) aged 15 to 29, 576 (50.7%) aged 30 to 64, and 177 (15.6%) aged 65 or older.

Ethnicities were 96.0% European/Pākehā, 6.1% Māori, 0.5% Pacific peoples, 1.3% Asian, and 2.1% other ethnicities (totals add to more than 100% since people could identify with multiple ethnicities).

The proportion of people born overseas was 16.6%, compared with 27.1% nationally.

Although some people objected to giving their religion, 55.7% had no religion, 34.8% were Christian, 0.5% were Buddhist and 2.1% had other religions.

Of those at least 15 years old, 213 (22.6%) people had a bachelor or higher degree, and 132 (14.0%) people had no formal qualifications. The median income was $37,000, compared with $31,800 nationally. The employment status of those at least 15 was that 510 (54.1%) people were employed full-time, 183 (19.4%) were part-time, and 24 (2.5%) were unemployed.

References

Landforms of the Tasman District
Populated places in the Tasman District
Plains of New Zealand
Tasman Bay